This article serves as an index – as complete as possible – of all the honorific orders or similar decorations awarded by Perlis, classified by Monarchies chapter and Republics chapter, and, under each chapter, recipients' countries and the detailed list of recipients.

Awards

MONARCHIES

Perlis Royal Family 
They have been awarded :

 Tuanku Sirajuddin of Perlis :
  Founding Grand Master of the Royal Family Order of Perlis (since 17 May 2001)
  Grand Master of the Perlis Family Order of the Gallant Prince Syed Putra Jamalullail (since 17 April 2000)
  Grand Master of the Order of Dato Bendahara Sri Jamalullail (since 2006)
  Grand Master of the Order of the Gallant Prince Syed Sirajuddin Jamalullail (since 2001)
  Grand Master of the Order of Prince Syed Sirajuddin Jamalullail of Perlis (since 2005)
 Order of the Gallant Prince Syed Putra Jamalullail : Knight Grand Companion (SSPJ, 4.12.1995) and Grand Master (since 17 April 2000)
  Grand Master of the Order of the Crown of Perlis (since 17 April 2000)
 Tuanku Fauziah (Tuanku Sirajuddin of Perlis's wife) :
  Recipient of the Perlis Family Order of the Gallant Prince Syed Putra Jamalullail (DK, 13.12.2001)
 Knight Grand Companion of the Order of the Gallant Prince Syed Putra Jamalullail (SSPJ, 4.12.1995)
  Knight Grand Commander of the Order of the Crown of Perlis or Star of Safi (SPMP, 15.2.1967)
 Tuanku Syed Faizuddin Putra Jamalullail (Tuanku Sirajuddin of Perlis's son) :
   Recipient of the Perlis Family Order of the Gallant Prince Syed Putra Jamalullail (DK, 13.12.2001)
  Knight Grand Commander of the Order of the Crown of Perlis or Star of Safi (SPMP, 17.5.1998)
 Tuanku Lailatul Shahreen (Tuanku Syed Faizuddin Putra Jamalullail's wife) :
  Knight Grand Commander of the Order of the Crown of Perlis or Star of Safi (SPMP, 17.5.2002)
 Sharifah Fazira (Tuanku Sirajuddin of Perlis's daughter) :
  Knight Grand Commander of the Order of the Crown of Perlis or Star of Safi (SPMP, 17.5.2002)
  Y.Bhg. Dato’ Paduka Mohammad Ya’acob bin Dato' Sri Aziz ul-Hassan (Sharifah Fazira's husband)
  Knight Companion of the Order of the Gallant Prince Syed Sirajuddin Jamalullail (DSSJ, 2003)

 STATES of MALAYSIA

Johor Royal Family 
They have been awarded :

 Sultan Ibrahim Ismail of Johor :
  Recipient of the Perlis Family Order of the Gallant Prince Syed Putra Jamalullail (DK, 16.05.2010)

Kelantan Royal Family 
They have been awarded:

 Muhammad V of Kelantan, Sultan of Kelantan (since 13 September 2010) :
  Recipient of the Perlis Family Order of the Gallant Prince Syed Putra Jamalullail (DK)
 Ismail Petra of Kelantan, Sultan Muhammad V of Kelantan's father and retired Sultan for illness :
  Recipient of the Perlis Family Order of the Gallant Prince Syed Putra Jamalullail (DK)
 Raja Perampuan Anis, Sultan Muhammad V of Kelantan's mother :
  Recipient of the Perlis Family Order of the Gallant Prince Syed Putra Jamalullail (DK)
  Knight Grand Commander of the Order of the Crown of Perlis or Star of Safi (SPMP, 1988)

Negeri Sembilan Royal Family 
They have been awarded:

 Muhriz of Negeri Sembilan, Yang di-Pertuan Besar :
  Recipient of the Perlis Family Order of the Gallant Prince Syed Putra Jamalullail (DK)
 Tunku Mudziah, Tengku Puan Sharif Bendahara, Yang di-Pertuan Besar's second younger sister 
  Knight Grand Commander of the Order of the Crown of Perlis or Star of Safi (SPMP)
 Tunku Naquiyuddin, Tunku Laksamana, elder son and second child of late Yang di-Pertuan Besar Jaafar of Negeri Sembilan :
  Knight Grand Commander of the Order of the Crown of Perlis or Star of Safi (SPMP, 2001)

Pahang Royal Family 

 Ahmad Shah of Pahang :
  Recipient of the Perlis Family Order of the Gallant Prince Syed Putra Jamalullail (DK)

Perak Royal Family 
They have been awarded:

 Sultan Raja Nazrin Shah : 
  Knight Grand Commander of the Order of the Crown of Perlis or Star of Safi (SPMP)

Selangor Royal Family 
They have been awarded :
 Sharafuddin of Selangor :
  Recipient of the Perlis Family Order of the Gallant Prince Syed Putra Jamalullail (DK, 11.12.2005)
 Tengku Nur Zihan, youngest sister of Sultan Sharafuddin
  Knight Commander of the Order of the Gallant Prince Syed Sirajuddin Jamalullail (DSPJ, 1999)

Terengganu Royal Family 
 Sultan Mizan Zainal Abidin of Terengganu (Sultan : since 15 May 1998 - Y.d-P.A. 12/2006-12/2011):
  Recipient of the Perlis Family Order of the Gallant Prince Syed Putra Jamalullail (DK, 28 May 1998)

to be completed

 ASIAN MONARCHIES

Brunei Royal Family 
See also List of Malaysian Honours awarded to Heads of State and Royals

 Hassanal Bolkiah :
  Recipient of the Perlis Family Order of the Gallant Prince Syed Putra Jamalullail (DK, 12.3.1988)

to be completed

 EUROPEAN MONARCHIES

to be completed

REPUBLICS 

to be completed

See also 
 Mirror page : List of honours of the Perlis Royal Family by country

References 

 
Perlis